Elephant and Piggie is a book series for early readers created by Mo Willems. The series, which debuted in 2007 with two books, is done in a comic book style, and features two friends: an elephant named Gerald, and a pig named Piggie. The books are written in conversational style with Piggie's words appearing in pink letter bubbles and Gerald's appearing in grey letter bubbles. The books often address issues of friendship. Books are added to the series on a roughly quarterly schedule, with two books occasionally released on the same day. There Is a Bird on Your Head! and Are You Ready to Play Outside? won the Geisel Medal in 2008 and 2009. Two books in the series have been listed on Time magazine's Top 10 Children's Books of the Year: Today I Will Fly! (ranked #2 in 2007) and Elephants Cannot Dance! (ranked #5 in 2009).

In August 2015, Willems announced that the 25th book in the series would be the last. Since then, Willems has developed a series called Elephant and Piggie Like Reading!, which features pictures books by other authors. Elephant and Piggie make brief cameo appearances to bookend these new stories. 

A musical has been produced based on the Elephant and Piggie books.

Books
 Today I Will Fly! (Apr 2007)
 My Friend is Sad (Apr 2007)
 I Am Invited to a Party! (Sep 2007)
 There Is a Bird on Your Head! (Sep 2007)
 I Love My New Toy! (Jun 2008)
 I Will Surprise My Friend! (Jun 2008) 
 Are You Ready To Play Outside? (Oct 2008)
 Watch Me Throw The Ball! (Mar 2009)
 Elephants Cannot Dance! (Jun 2009)
 Pigs Make Me Sneeze! (Oct 2009)
 I Am Going! (Jan 2010)
 Can I Play Too? (Jun 2010)
 We Are In A Book! (Sep 2010)
 I Broke My Trunk! (Feb 2011)
 Should I Share My Ice Cream? (Jun 2011)
 Happy Pig Day! (Oct 2011)
 Listen To My Trumpet! (Feb 2012)
 Let's Go for a Drive! (Oct 2012)
 A Big Guy Took My Ball! (May 2013)
 I'm a Frog! (Oct 2013)
 My New Friend Is So Fun! (Jun 2014)
 Waiting Is Not Easy! (Nov 2014)
 I Will Take a Nap! (Jun 2015)
 I Really Like Slop! (Oct 2015)
 The Thank You Book (May 2016)

Books in the series Elephant and Piggie Like Reading!
 We Are Growing (Sep 2016)
 The Cookie Fiasco (Sep 2016)
 The Good for Nothing Button (May 2017)
 It's Shoe Time! (Nov 2017)
 The Itchy Book (May 2018)
 Harold & Hog Pretend for Real! (May 2019)
 What About Worms?! (May 2020)
 I'm On It! (May 2021)

"Elephant and Piggie Biggie" bound compilations
 contains Today I Will Fly!, Watch Me Throw the Ball!, Can I Play Too?, Let's Go For a Drive!, and I Really Like Slop! (2017)
 contains I Am Going!, We Are in a Book!, I Broke My Trunk!, Listen to My Trumpet!, and I'm a Frog! (2019)
 contains There is a Bird on Your Head!, Are You Ready to Play Outside?, Elephants Cannot Dance!, Should I Share My Ice Cream?, and I Will Take a Nap! (2020)
 contains My Friend is Sad, I Love My New Toy!, Pigs Make Me Sneeze!, A Big Guy Took My Ball!, and My New Friend is So Fun! (2021)
 contains I Am Invited to a Party!, I Will Surprise My Friend!, Happy Pig Day!, Waiting Is Not Easy!, and The Thank You Book'' (2022)

References

American children's books
American picture books
Books about elephants
Books about pigs
Children's books about friendship
Literary duos
Series of children's books